The President of the Second Chamber of the States of the Grand Duchy of Hesse was the presiding officer of the lower chamber of that legislature.

Sources
Ruppel, Hans Georg and Groß, Birgit: Hessische Abegeordnete 1820–1930, Düsseldorf 1980, 

Political history of Germany
Hesse